The Church of All Saints is a Church of England parish church in the Uplands area of Stroud, Gloucestershire. The church is a Grade I listed building. It was designed by Temple Moore in the Gothic Revival style and was completed by Leslie Moore after Temple's death.

References

External links
 Parish website
 A Church Near You entry

Stroud
Stroud
Stroud
20th-century Church of England church buildings
Stroud